Marina Pupina (born 15 May 1977) is a Kazakhstani speed skater. She competed in two events at the 2002 Winter Olympics.

References

1977 births
Living people
Kazakhstani female speed skaters
Olympic speed skaters of Kazakhstan
Speed skaters at the 2002 Winter Olympics
People from Kostanay
Speed skaters at the 2003 Asian Winter Games
21st-century Kazakhstani women